The scalloped antbird (Myrmoderus ruficauda) is a species of passerine bird in the family Thamnophilidae. It is endemic to Brazil.

Its natural habitats are subtropical or tropical dry forest and subtropical or tropical moist lowland forest. It is threatened by habitat loss.

The scalloped antbird was formerly included in the genus Myrmeciza. A molecular phylogenetic study published in 2013 found that Myrmeciza, as then defined, was polyphyletic. In the resulting rearrangement to create monotypic genera four species including the scalloped antbird were moved to the resurrected genus Myrmoderus.

References

External links
BirdLife Species Factsheet.

scalloped antbird
Birds of the Atlantic Forest
Endemic birds of Brazil
scalloped antbird
Taxonomy articles created by Polbot